Mount Phillips may refer to:

 Mount Phillips (Canada), a mountain on the Continental Divide on the border between British Columbia and Alberta, Canada
 Mount Phillips (Antarctica) a snow-covered mountain situated on the Borchgrevink Coast, Victoria Land, Antarctica
 Mount Phillips (Montana)
 Mount Phillips (New Mexico)
 Mount Phillips (Vancouver Island)